Carlos Ciriaco Ameghino (16 June 1865 – 12 April 1936) was an Argentine paleontologist and explorer who accompanied his brother Florentino Ameghino throughout Argentina searching for fossils.

Scientific career 
Carlos Ameghino was educated as a naturalist with his brother Florentino Ameghino on his journeys to Buenos Aires and the Chaco Province in Argentina. The goal of this expedition was to collect fossils.

In 1887, he decided to explore South Argentina, and the watersheds of the Santa Cruz River, the Chubut River, the Chico River, the Deseado River, the Gallegos River, and the Straits of Megellan. He discovered many fossils and created several geological and paleontological reports in his research that he gave to his brother. He also demonstrated the exact superposition of two great tertiary formations.

1865 births
1936 deaths
People from Luján, Buenos Aires
Argentine people of Ligurian descent
Argentine paleontologists
Argentine explorers